Admiral McLean may refer to:

Rear Admiral Walter McLean (U.S. Navy officer) (1855–1930), USN, American commander of the Norfolk Naval Shipyard
Rear Admiral Ridley McLean (1872–1933), USN
Vice Admiral Rory McLean (1950–2021), British Royal Navy
Surgeon Rear-Admiral Timothy Blair McLean (1910–1982), Royal Canadian Navy